Viktória Kužmová (born 11 May 1998) is a Slovak professional tennis player. She has been ranked as high as No. 43 in singles and No. 27 in doubles in the world by the Women's Tennis Association (WTA). Kužmová has won four WTA doubles titles and 21 titles (14 in singles, 7 in doubles) on the ITF Circuit. She also ended runner-up at the Premier-level 2019 St. Petersburg Trophy in the doubles event, along with Anna Kalinskaya.

As a junior, she won the girls' doubles event at the 2015 US Open alongside Aleksandra Pospelova, defeating Kalinskaya and Anastasia Potapova in the final. A year later, she entered final of the 2016 US Open in the girls' singles, where she lost to Kayla Day. She continued her success at majors as a senior, reaching the 2019 US Open semifinal in the women's doubles alongside Aliaksandra Sasnovich, where they lost to the eventual champions Ashleigh Barty and Victoria Azarenka.

Early life and background
Kužmová was born 1998 in Košice to mother Ingrid and father Radovan. Sister Katarina, who is three years younger, followed her into the world of professional tennis, and obtained her WTA first ranking points in 2018. Kužmová was introduced to tennis at age four by her father, who used to run a tennis club.

Junior career
Kužmová reached a career-high ranking of No. 24 as a junior. She began playing on the ITF Junior Circuit in January 2012 at age 13, and in September of the same year won her first singles and doubles titles at the low-level Grade-5 Mostar Open. The following year, she won the Grade-4 Nazmi Bari Cup in the singles event, and a week later she finished as runner-up in the singles and as champion in the doubles at another Grade-4, the Montenegro Open. During her quarterfinal match at the 2013 Losinj Juniors Cup, against another Slovakian player, Nikola Dolakova, she was forced to retire in the second set due to injury. She spent rest of the 2013 season out of tennis.

She returned in early 2014, when she reached her first Grade-2 final in the singles event at the Slovak Junior Indoor. A month later, partnering with Kristína Schmiedlová, she won the doubles title at the Grade-1 Mediterranee Avenir in Casablanca, after being awarded a walkover victory due to the withdrawal of Ioana Ducu and Anna Bondár. Later, again with Schmiedlová, she won another doubles title at the Grade-1 Perin Memorial in Umag. Kužmová made her junior Grand Slam debut in 2014 at the French Open, reaching only the first round in both the singles and the doubles. Then, she went one round further at Wimbledon, reaching the second round in both the singles and the doubles. At the US Open, she lost in the second round in singles but partnered with Schmiedlová to make her first semifinal at a Grand Slam event.

In January 2015, in her debut at the Australian Open, she reached her first Grand Slam third round in singles, while in doubles, she failed in the first round. Despite an early loss at the French Open in both singles and doubles, Kužmová then reached her first singles Grand Slam semifinal at Wimbledon, but lost to eventual champion Sofya Zhuk. She also made progress in doubles, winning the 2015 US Open alongside Russian player Aleksandra Pospelova. They defeated Potapova and Kalinskaya on their way to the title. Next year, she failed in defending her US Open doubles title but finished runner-up in singles, losing to Kayla Day. During her junior career, she also won two doubles titles with her younger sister Katarina at the Grade-4 Ziliona Junior Open in August 2015 and 2016.

Career

2017–18: WTA Tour & Grand Slam debut

Kužmová made her Grand Slam debut at the 2017 US Open. After qualifying, she lost in the first round of the main draw to Venus Williams. She also qualified for the Linz Open and marked her first singles win on WTA Tour, defeating Anna-Lena Friedsam before she lost to another German player, Tatjana Maria. In 2017, Kužmová also appeared at Roland Garros and Wimbledon, but lost at both in qualifying. On 6 March 2017, Kužmová entered the top 200 for the first time, getting to 190th place. On 16 October, she reached No. 130 – her best ranking until 2018. She finished 2017 season at world No. 132. 
Being outside the top 100, Kužmová was forced to play qualifying at many tournaments. Her first event in 2018 was the Auckland Open, where she reached the main draw and marked her first win in 2018, defeating Jade Lewis but lost to Julia Görges in the second round. At her first Australian Open, she qualified but still was not ready to mark her first Grand Slam main-draw win, losing to Elise Mertens. At the St. Petersburg Trophy, she passed qualifying but then lost to Daria Kasatkina in the first round of the main draw. At the Hungarian Open, Kužmová made her first WTA semifinal and was then stopped by Alison Van Uytvanck.

In the clay-court season, Kužmová lost in the first round of the Prague Open. A few days after turning 20, she won the $100k Empire Slovak Open, and the following week, on 21 May 2018, she debuted in the top 100, being noted 84th. At her French Open debut, she marked her first Grand Slam main-draw match win, defeating former French Open champion, Francesca Schiavone. In the second round, she lost to No. 4 seed, Elina Svitolina, in straight sets. She started grass-court season, reaching her second WTA singles semifinal at the Rosmalen Championships, where she lost to Kirsten Flipkens. At the Mallorca Open, she had to qualify and succeeded before she lost to Polona Hercog in the first round. She finished her grass-court season with her main-draw debut at Wimbledon, where she was defeated by Rebecca Peterson – but with that match she completed participation at all four Grand Slam events in the main draw. After that, she competed on the ITF Circuit. At the Hungarian Ladies Open, she won the title defeating Ekaterina Alexandrova; it was her second $100K singles career title.

Returning to WTA Tour, she played at the Swiss Open in Gstaad and at the Moscow River Cup. In Gstaad, she defeated Martina Trevisan in the first round, and then lost to Veronika Kudermetova. In Moscow, she lost in the first round of the main draw to Görges. She then went to the US Open Series, first at the Cincinnati Open, where she played her first Premier Mandatory/Premier 5 qualifying and beat Caroline Dolehide and Camila Giorgi, securing her place in the main draw. There she marked her first Premier 5 win, defeating another qualifier, Sasnovich, in three sets. In the second round, she lost to Kristina Mladenovic. At the US Open, she lost to Azarenka in the first round of the main draw. In September, Kužmová went to China to play at the Guangzhou Open, where she defeated Ivana Jorović in the first round but lost in the next round to Bernarda Pera. Her next step was the Premier 5 Wuhan Open, where she lost in the first round of qualifying to Wang Xiyu. Back in Europe, she lost in the first rounds of the Linz Open and the Luxembourg Open. On 17 December 2018, after winning the $100k Dubai Challenge, Kužmová debuted in the top 50, at world No. 50. She finished the year as No. 56.

2019: Success in doubles, Dubai QF & first top-10 win in singles

Singles: Continuing progress
Kužmová started the year really well, getting to the semifinal at the Auckland Open, where Julia Görges stopped her achieving her first WTA singles final. Then, at both the Hobart International and Australian Open, she was eliminated in the second round, losing to Flipkens in Hobart, and then to Svitolina in Melbourne (Australian Open). At the Dubai Tennis Championships, she reached her first Premier 5 quarterfinal, winning against Pera, Kiki Bertens and Sofia Kenin, before she lost to Petra Kvitová. The win against Bertens in the second round of the Dubai Championships was her first top-ten win. She then traveled to the United States to play the Premier-Mandatory Indian Wells Open, where she lost in the first round to Zhang Shuai. This was followed up by a third round on her debut of the another Premier-Mandatory tournament, the Miami Open, where she was eliminated by Bertens.

Her first tournament of the clay-court season was the Ladies Open Lugano, where she went to the second round before losing to Iga Świątek. She then lost in the first round of the Istanbul Cup to Barbora Strýcová, followed by another first-round loss at the Prague Open to Anna Karolína Schmiedlová. At the Premier Mandatory-level Madrid Open, she won against Julia Görges and Carla Suárez Navarro, in the first two rounds, and then failed to reach her first Premier Mandatory quarterfinal, losing to Simona Halep in the third round. The next week, at the Premier 5 Italian Open, she was better than Sara Errani in the first round but then lost to Barty in three sets. She closed out this part of the season with her performance at the French Open. During the first set in the second round, her opponent, seed No. 4 Bertens, was forced to retire due to injury. This provided Kužmová her first appearance in the third round of a Grand Slam tournament. She then lost to Johanna Konta.

After the clay-court season, Kužmová did not do well, losing in the first round at all of the grass tournaments: at the Rosmalen Championships to Margarita Gasparyan, at the Mallorca Open to Maria Sharapova, and at Wimbledon to Polona Hercog. At the clay-played Bucharest Open, she went to the quarterfinal, where eventual champion Elena Rybakina defeated her. At the Palermo Ladies Open, she was eliminated by Arantxa Rus in the second round. On the US hardcourt tour, she suffered three first-round losses: at the Cincinnati Open she lost to Zheng Saisai, winning only four games, then at the Bronx Open, she lost to Karolína Muchová, while at the US Open she lost to Van Uytvanck. After that, she made two quarterfinals, at the Tashkent Open, where Kristýna Plíšková eliminated her and at the Linz Open, where Andrea Petkovic sent her out the tournament. The Luxembourg Open was the last WTA tournament for Kužmová in 2019, where she lost in the second round to Laura Siegemund.

Doubles: Top 30, US Open semifinals, two titles on WTA Tour
2019 was also successful for Kužmová in the doubles. She reached three WTA doubles finals. The most significant one is Premier-level St. Petersburg Trophy, where she partnered with Anna Kalinskaya and lost to Russian combination Gasparyan and Ekaterina Makarova. However, she won another two finals, two International-level ones. First, in May, she won the Prague Open alongside Kalinskaya defeating Nicole Melichar and Květa Peschke. Then, in July, she won the Bucharest Open final, this time with Kristýna Plíšková. They beat Romanian combination Jaqueline Cristian and Elena-Gabriela Ruse. On 4 February 2019, after reaching the final in St. Petersburg, Kužmová debuted in the top 100, at world No. 94. 
And on 9 September 2019, after reaching semifinals at the US Open, she entered the top 30 for the first time.

2020: Premier 5 semifinal in doubles

Kužmová kicked off her 2020 season at the Auckland Open. She lost in the first round to Coco Gauff. The following week at Hobart, she was defeated in the second round by top seed and two-time champion, Elise Mertens. Then, at the Australian Open, Kužmová lost in the first round to Julia Görges. There she also played in the doubles, reaching the third round alongside Sasnovich. She followed up this by her performance at the Premier-level St. Petersburg Trophy, where she lost in the first round to Océane Dodin, winning only four games. At the newly introduced International-level Lyon Open, she got to her first singles quarterfinal in 2020, before losing to Anna-Lena Friedsam and also reaching the semifinal in doubles.

Restarting the tour after the COVID-19 pandemic outbreak, Kužmová lost in the first round of the US Open to Caty McNally, at the Istanbul Cup to Van Uytvanck and at the French Open to Kristýna Plíšková, and failed to qualify at the Cincinnati Open. Despite the loss in singles qualifying at the Cincinnati Open, she got to her first Premier 5/Premier Mandatory semifinal in doubles. She partnered Iga Świątek, but they failed to reach the final losing to Nicole Melichar and Xu Yifan. She finished the 2020 season with another first-round loss at the Linz Open, losing there to Stefanie Vögele.

National representation

Junior competitions
In August 2014, she made her first appearance at the Youth Olympic Games but lost to Jeļena Ostapenko in the first round. In the doubles, she was also eliminated in the first round, partnering with Kristína Schmiedlová, and also played in the mixed doubles alongside Martin Blasko, reaching the second round. A month later, Kužmová represented Slovakia at the Junior Fed Cup in 2014. In the round-robin, Slovakia faced France, Egypt and Japan and defeated all three teams. During the round-robin, Kužmová won all of her three singles matches against Tessah Andrianjafitrimo from France, Habiba Lasheen from Egypt and Chihiro Muramatsu from Japan. In the doubles, she recorded another two wins in the round-robin, partnering with Tereza Mihalíková against Japan and Tamara Kupkova against Egypt. Slovakia then advanced to the semifinal, where they played against Hungary. She defeated Hungarian player Fanny Stollár in three sets. After Slovakia beat Hungary 2–1, they advanced to the final, in order to fight for the trophy against the United States. Slovakia lost all three-matches, including Kužmová's loss against CiCi Bellis.

The following year, she played at the European Summer Cups. In the first round, Slovakia faced Russia. Kužmová lost her match against Anna Kalinskaya, while Tereza Mihalíková defeated Anna Blinkova, leaving some hopes for her team to qualify to the next round. The decisive match belonged to Russia, where Kalinskaya and Aleksandra Pospelova defeated Kužmová and Mihalíková. Slovakia then has to fight for 5th-8th place, and first faced the United Kingdom. Kužmová won her singles match against Maia Lumsden, but lost in the doubles alongside Martina Okalova to Emily Arbuthnott and Ema Lazic. This meant that Slovakia needed to fight for seventh place against the Netherlands. Kužmová only played in the doubles as the decisive match, and won alongside Mihalíková after losing only one game.

Fed Cup / Billie Jean King Cup

Kužmová made her senior Fed Cup debut for Slovakia in 2018. In 2020, the tournament changed its name to the Billie Jean King Cup. She has played in four ties, compiling an overall record of 5–3 split between 5–1 in singles and 0–2 in doubles. When Kužmová debuted for Slovakia, they were in World Group II, playing against Russia. She debuted with a singles loss against Natalia Vikhlyantseva but in the next match, she defeated Anastasia Potapova. Slovakia defeated Russia 4–1, and advanced to the World Group Play–offs, where they played against Belarus for a spot in the World Group following year. Despite the fact that Slovakia lost, Kužmová won both of her singles matches, against Aryna Sabalenka and Sasnovich. In a decisive match against Lidziya Marozava and Vera Lapko, Kužmová and Anna Karolína Schmiedlová failed to send their country in the World Group. The following year, in her first match in the World Group II Play-offs against Brazil, she faced Beatriz Haddad Maia and won. Since it was obvious that Slovakia had won, Kužmová's match against Carolina Alves was cancelled but she played doubles alongside Rebecca Šramková and they lost in straight sets. In 2020, for the third year in-a-row, Kužmová was part of the team. Playing against Great Britain, she defeated Harriet Dart.

Playing style

Kužmová is most known for her fast and aggressive style of play. She is also talented striker of the ball. She has the ability to create easy pace off both wings, which makes her hard to play against as she presents problems from both sides. Despite growing up on clay as only surface available in her hometown Košice, she prefers hardcourt. There, with her strong serve, she is able to win many points but she also enjoys playing on other surfaces, especially grass.

Apparel and equipment
Kužmová is sponsored by Yonex. She uses the VCORE-100 racquet and Tourna grip.

Coach
During her junior ages, she was coached by Ján Sabovčík with whom she triumphed at the 2015 US Open in the doubles event. They split in late 2017. Then in December 2017, she started collaboration with Slovakian tennis player Michal Mertiňák. In June 2020, she ended her collaboration with him. She is currently coached by Tomáš Hrunčák.

Personal life
Kužmová resides in Košice in Slovakia. In October 2018, she began studying International Relations and Diplomacy at a Czech university with a campus in Bratislava. Along with tennis, she enjoys reading books, and also photography. Her favourite place is Long Island City. Growing up, she enjoyed watching Ana Ivanovic and Rafael Nadal. She plays for VSE TK Akademik Košice tennis club. She is a member of the "STARS for STARS" project.

She won the award for the Slovakian Talent of the Year in 2012 and 2014. Kuzmova was nominated for the 2018 Fed Cup Heart Award, after making two important wins against Aryna Sabalenka and Aliaksandra Sasnovich, but lost to Eugenie Bouchard.

Performance timelines

Only main draw results in WTA Tour, Grand Slam tournaments, Fed Cup/Billie Jean King Cup and Olympic Games are included in win–loss records.

Singles
Current through the 2023 Auckland Open.

Doubles
Current after the 2023 Linz Open.

WTA career finals

Doubles: 7 (4 titles, 3 runner-ups)

ITF Circuit finals

Singles: 25 (14 titles, 11 runner–ups)

Doubles: 11 (7 titles, 4 runner–ups)

Junior Grand Slam tournament finals

Girls' singles: 1 (runner–up)

Girls' doubles: 1 (title)

Top 10 wins

Notes

References

External links

 
 
 
 
 
 

1998 births
Living people
Sportspeople from Košice
Slovak female tennis players
US Open (tennis) junior champions
Grand Slam (tennis) champions in girls' doubles
Tennis players at the 2014 Summer Youth Olympics